Pyramidulidae is a family of small air-breathing land snails, terrestrial pulmonate gastropod mollusks in the superfamily Pupilloidea.

Anatomy
In this family, the number of haploid chromosomes lies between 26 and 30 (according to the values in this table).

Genera
Genera within the family Pyramidulidae include:
 Pyramidula Fitzinger, 1833 - the type genus
Synonyms
 Cratere Porro, 1838: synonym of Pyramidula Fitzinger, 1833
 Pyramidulops Habe, 1956: synonym of Pyramidula Fitzinger, 1833

References

External links 
  Harl J., Haring E., Asami T., Sittenthaler M., Sattmann H. & Páll-Gergely B. (2017). Molecular systematics of the land snail family Orculidae reveal paraphyly and deep splits within the clade Orthurethra (Gastropoda: Pulmonata). Zoological Journal of the Linnean Society. 181(4): 778-794